The Swiss National Badminton Championships is a tournament organized to crown the best badminton players in Switzerland. The tournament started in 1955 and is held every year.

Past winners

References

External links 
Details of affiliated national organisations at Badminton Europe

Badminton tournaments in Switzerland
National badminton championships
Recurring sporting events established in 1955
1955 establishments in Switzerland
Badminton